Living Hope may refer to:

Living Hope (album), a 2018 album by Phil Wickham
"Living Hope" (song), a 2018 song by Phil Wickham
Living Hope, 2014 Christian documentary film about South Africa, produced by Mitchell Galin
Maranatha Living Hope Academy
Living Hope, a 2003 album by Sinikithemba Choir